The Chinese Black and White or Chinese Black Pied is a Chinese breed of dairy cattle. It derives from cross-breeding with local cows of black-and-white dairy cattle of various breeds imported since the 1870s from Canada, Germany, Japan, the Netherlands, the United Kingdom and the United States. It is the most numerous dairy breed in China and is distributed throughout the country.

History

Black-and-white dairy cattle were imported to major cities in China in the 1870s from Canada, Germany, Japan, the UK and the USA. After the Second World War large American Holstein-Friesians were imported, as was smaller Dutch Black Pied stock from the Netherlands. These at first gave rise to larger and smaller types within the Chinese breed, but these can no longer be distinguished. A herd-book was established in 1983. This records all pedigree cattle.

Use

The milk averages 3.3% fat in the southern part of the country, and 3.4% in the north.

References

Cattle breeds
Cattle breeds originating in China